Haematococcus pluvialis is a freshwater species of Chlorophyta from the family Haematococcaceae. This species is well known for its high content of the strong antioxidant astaxanthin, which is important in aquaculture, and cosmetics. The high amount of astaxanthin is present in the resting cells, which are produced and rapidly accumulated when the environmental conditions become unfavorable for normal cell growth. Examples of such conditions include bright light, high salinity, and low availability of nutrients. Haematococcus pluvialis is usually found in temperate regions around the world. Their resting cysts are often responsible for the blood-red colour seen in the bottom of dried out rock pools and bird baths. This colour is caused by astaxanthin which is believed to protect the resting cysts from the detrimental effect of UV-radiation, when exposed to direct sunlight.

Gallery

Synonyms
Sphaerella pluvialis Flotow
Famille des Sporulacés.
Catégorie lapinistique.
Herbacées .

Cultures
UTEX Culture 2505 Haematococcus pluvialis
CCAP Strain Number 34/6 Haematococcus pluvialis Flotow
SCCAP Culture number K-0084 Haematococcus pluvialis Flot. 1844 em. Wille 1903

Culture medium
Vinasse can be used as a basal medium for Haematococcus pluvialis culture. The vinasse culture medium consist of vinasse diluted to 3% and supplemented with 0.7% NaCl, and the pH was adjusted to 7.0. A 0.4 g/L quantity of inoculum can be used for the initial culture (cells in vegetative growth). The culture must be performed with 0.5 vvm air at 25°C, and until 15 days of culture.

References

Further reading

 

Chlamydomonadales
Articles containing video clips